William George Ernest Luddington (8 February 1894 – ) was an England international rugby union footballer who gained 13 caps between 1922 and 1926.  He was a goal-kicking fly-half or centre, playing for Devonport Services and the Royal Navy.

Having no known grave, he is listed on the Plymouth Naval Memorial.

References

 War Service
 Rugby stats (NB position is wrong)

1894 births
1941 deaths
English rugby union players
England international rugby union players
Royal Navy sailors
Royal Navy personnel killed in World War II
Deaths by airstrike during World War II